Shree Saibaba Heart Institute and Research Centre is a cardiology and multi-speciality hospital near Kalidas Kala Mandir in Nashik, Maharashtra state, India. It provides treatment for patients with cardiac issues.
The hospital was founded by Dr. Aniruddha Dharmadhikari, a cardiologist in Nashik. He has worked with hospitals including Sir J.J Hospital, and University Hospital San Raffaele, Milan, Italy.The hospital is near Kalidas kalamandir. The hospital has been operating since 11 years and Dr. Dharmadhikari is considered as one of the best doctors in nashik.

References

Hospitals in Maharashtra
Nashik district
2009 establishments in Maharashtra
Hospitals established in 2009